Two miles outside of St. Regis, 45 Canadian voyageurs were stationed in a house to watch for American attacks and provide confidence to the Mohawks in the area. A larger American force under Major Guilford Dudley was able to surprise the Canadians and take most of them captive.

Background
The village of St. Regis was on land belonging to the Mowhawk first nation tribe. 45 Canadian voyageurs were stationed 2 miles from St. Regis to watch for American attacks and give confidence to the Natives in the area. Seven miles away the Americans built a blockhouse at French Mills. 100 Americans commanded by Major Guilford Dudley Young left their Blockhouse at French Mills and marched against the Canadians at St. Regis.

Action
At 5:00 am, the Americans arrived a half-mile from the Canadians and hid behind a small hill. They rested, prepared, and made a plan of attack. Most of the Canadians were sleeping in a house except for a few on guard duty. The plan of attack was for Captain Lyon to lead a detachment on their right to go up the St. Regis River and to the rear of the house. Captain Dilden led a detachment whose goal was to move along the St. Lawrence River and capture the Canadians' boats. The main force under Young advanced directly towards the house. Youngs' force stopped 150 yards from the house and opened fire on the guards. Lyon's force also engaged with Canadians at the rear of the house.   After the first volley from Young and Lyon's men the Canadians surrendered. Five Canadians had been killed and another 40 were taken prisoner.

Aftermath
The victorious Americans looted the house the Canadians were staying in as well as the dead Voyageurs. While many of the Americans involved were ordered to Plattsburgh many stayed at French Mills. British and Canadian soldiers would lead a successful attack on French Mills killing or capturing many of the Americans who were at St. Regis.

References

Sources

1812 in Lower Canada
St. Regis